Mian Rud (also Romanized as Mīān Rūd; also known as Mīān Rūd-e Harāzpey) is a village in Harazpey-ye Jonubi Rural District, in the Central District of Amol County, Mazandaran Province, Iran. At the 2006 census, its population was 263, in 72 families.

References 

Populated places in Amol County